Benedetto Bandiera (1557 or 1560–1634) was an Italian painter of the early-Baroque period. Born in Perugia, where he painted in the style of Federico Barocci. He painted frescoes in the convent adjacent to the Church of San Pietro of Perugia. There are paintings of his in the church and museum of San Francesco in Corciano.

Other works included:
Three altarpiece at the Saint Catherine church in Perugia
Saint Ursula, San Domenico, Perugia
Saint Bonaventure, San Francesco, Perugia
Virgin and Child, Saint John the Baptist, Palazzo Penna

References

16th-century births
1634 deaths
16th-century Italian painters
Italian male painters
17th-century Italian painters
Italian Baroque painters
Umbrian painters